Vernon Place, also known as the Cowper-Taylor House, is a historic plantation house located near Como, Hertford County, North Carolina. It is dated to the late-1820s, and is a two-story, five bay, "T"-plan, transitional Federal / Greek Revival frame dwelling. It has a low-pitched, gable
roof and Colonial Revival style one-story hip-roof wraparound porch added about 1900. Also on the property are the contributing one-room, -story frame Federal style house, wellhouse, and a Delco plant.

It was listed on the National Register of Historic Places in 1982.

External links
NRHP Inventory for Vernon Place

References

Plantation houses in North Carolina
Houses on the National Register of Historic Places in North Carolina
Federal architecture in North Carolina
Greek Revival houses in North Carolina
Colonial Revival architecture in North Carolina
Houses in Hertford County, North Carolina
National Register of Historic Places in Hertford County, North Carolina